Delta Dawn is the debut studio album by American country music singer Tanya Tucker. It was released on September 11, 1972, by Columbia Records. The album was produced by Billy Sherrill and includes two top ten singles, "Delta Dawn" and "Love's the Answer"/"The Jamestown Ferry".

Critical reception
The review published in the September 23, 1972 issue of Cashbox said, "We've already seen Tanya Tucker breeze up the country and pop singles charts with "Delta Dawn", establishing herself as country music's first thirteen-year-old superstar. Now this album will establish her versatility, a talent necessary for longevity, since even thirteen-year-olds grow up someday. Tanya Tucker won't always be a child star, but if this album is an indication, she'll always be a star." The review also noted "Soul Song", "I'm So Lonesome I Could Cry", and "Love's the Answer" as the best cuts on the album.

Commercial performance
The album peaked at No. 32 on the US Billboard Hot Country LP's chart.

The album's first single, "Delta Dawn", was released in April 1972 and peaked at No. 6 on the US Billboard Hot Country Singles chart and No. 72 on the US Billboard Hot 100. In Canada, the single peaked at No. 3 on the RPM Country Singles chart. The album's second single, "Love's the Answer", was released in October 1972 and peaked at No. 5 on the US Billboard Hot Country Singles chart with its B-side, "The Jamestown Ferry". In Canada, the single peaked at No. 1 on the RPM Country Singles chart.

Track listing

Personnel
Adapted from the album liner notes.
Tanya Tucker – lead vocals
Lou Bradley – engineer
The Jordanaires – background vocals
The Nashville Edition – background vocals
Billy Sherrill – producer

Charts
Album

Singles

Charted B-sides

Release history

References 

1972 debut albums
Tanya Tucker albums
Albums produced by Billy Sherrill
Columbia Records albums